Hayley Amanda Legg is an Australian folk rock multi-instrumentalist and singer.

Biography

Legg lives in Sydney. As a child she learned the Beatles' songs on the piano; in high school she played guitar. Legg also sings vocals and plays bass guitar and drums. She incorporated the ukulele into her music after being inspired by a trip to Hawaii. She has been a lifelong fan of the South Sydney Rabbitohs.

Internet musician 

Legg began uploading her music videos to YouTube as a way to contact a friend (who was living overseas) to watch her perform. This became a popular music channel on YouTube, and for Legg, it developed into an obsession. With over 7 million views, Hayley Legg was the 11th most subscribed Australian musician of all time on YouTube.

The internet success reignited her passion and drive for music, so Legg resumed writing, recording and performing her original songs, as well as cover versions, around Sydney and on internet sites. Legg released her debut solo acoustic album, About Time, in February 2009. She won the Songs Alive national Singer Songwriter competition in March. She has a self-titled live album which was recorded at The Basement in November. She was an unsigned independent artist.

Legg's influences include Joni Mitchell, James Taylor, Missy Higgins, Sheryl Crow, the Beatles, Jack Johnson, Jewel, Mįçrövávê and KT Tunstall.

Discography

 February 2009: About Time
 November 2009: The Basement

Awards and nominations

 2009
 Songs Alive National Singer Songwriter Competition
 As of October 2010
 Hayley is the 11th most subscribed Australian Musician of All Time on Youtube.com

References

External links 

 

Australian singer-songwriters
Living people
1983 births
Musicians from Sydney
Legg, Hayley
21st-century Australian singers
21st-century Australian women singers
Australian women singer-songwriters